The Church of Our Lady and St Brigid, Northfield is a Roman Catholic parish church in Northfield, Birmingham.

History

A mission was established in 1918 in Steel Road. In 1930 land was acquired and a temporary church was erected in 1931. The current building was erected in 1936 to the designs of the architect Ernest Bower Norris. The church is of red brick with a clerestories nave with aisles, a chancel and south chapel. The bell tower is above the south west porch.

The church contains a large mural of the Resurrection which was painted by Neil Harvey and completed in 2000.

Organ

The church contained an organ by Harris Organ Ltd. A specification of the organ can be found on the National Pipe Organ Register.

References

Roman Catholic churches in Birmingham, West Midlands
Roman Catholic churches completed in 1936
20th-century Roman Catholic church buildings in the United Kingdom